Guter may be the name of:
 Donald J. Guter (born 1948), American educator and navy officer
 Guter Fernández de Castro (flourished 1124–66), Castilian nobleman and military commander
 Johannes Guter (1882–1962), Latvian-born German filmmaker
 Mattias Guter (born 1988), Swedish ice hockey player

See also 
 
 Gutter (disambiguation)